is a Japanese manga series written and illustrated by Masasumi Kakizaki. It has been serialized in Kodansha's seinen manga magazine Monthly Young Magazine since December 2021.

Publication
Kodansha released the first tankōbon volume on June 20, 2022.

Volume list

References

External links
  

Dark fantasy anime and manga
Kodansha manga
Seinen manga